48 Shades (titled Australian Pie: Naked Love in the United States) is a 2006 Australian comedy film by debut director Daniel Lapaine, starring Richard Wilson, Emma Lung, Robin McLeavy, and Victoria Thaine. It is based on Nick Earls' popular 1999 novel 48 Shades of Brown.

It was filmed in Brisbane, Australia. School scenes from the film were filmed in the real-life Brisbane Boys' College. The book on which the film is based has also been adapted into a play for La Boite Theatre Company.

Plot
A few months ago Dan had to make a choice. Go to Geneva with his parents for a year, board at school or move into a house with his uni student bass-playing aunt, Jacq, and her friend, Naomi. He picked Jacq's place.

Now he's doing his last year at school and trying not to spin out. Trying to be cool. Trying to pick up a few skills for surviving in the adult world. Problem is, he falls for Naomi, and things become much, much more confusing.

As Dan fumbles through the process of forming a relationship with someone of the opposite sex, he also learns about making pesto, interpreting the fish tank scene from the film Romeo + Juliet, why almost all birds are one of the 48 shades of brown, and why his best course of action is just to be himself.

Cast
Richard Wilson as Dan Bancroft
Robin McLeavy as Jacq
Emma Lung as Naomi
Nick Donaldson as Chris Burns
Michael Booth as Phil Borthwick
Victoria Thaine as Imogen
Eleanor Logan as Lisa
Paul Bishop as Mr. Wilkes
Cory Robinson as Jason
Nick Earls as Deli Owner

References

External links

2000s coming-of-age comedy films
2006 films
Australian coming-of-age comedy films
2000s English-language films
Films based on Australian novels
Australian independent films
Films shot in Brisbane
Films set in Brisbane
2006 independent films
2000s Australian films